Oceanisphaera arctica is a Gram-negative, coccoid and non-motile  bacterium from the genus of Oceanisphaera which has been isolated from marine sediments from Kongsfjorden.

References

External links
Type strain of Oceanimonas smirnovii at BacDive -  the Bacterial Diversity Metadatabase

Aeromonadales
Bacteria described in 2012